Boris Petrovich Mikhailov (born October 6, 1944) is a former Russian ice hockey player.

In 2000, he was inducted into the IIHF Hall of Fame.

Career
Mikhailov played right wing on the top Soviet line of the 1970s, along with left winger Valeri Kharlamov and center Vladimir Petrov. During Soviet League play, he played in 572 games, scoring a record 428 goals along with 224 assists for a record 652 points.

On the Soviet national team, he played 14 seasons, most of them as captain. He scored over 200 goals with the national team, second only to Alexander Maltsev. He led his team to the Olympic gold medal in 1972 and 1976, a silver medal in 1980, eight IIHF World Championships (1969, 1970, 1971, 1973, 1974, 1975, 1978, 1979), and nine Izvestia championships. Mikhailov's last game with the Soviet national team was played in front of 14,000 people at Luzhniki Ice Palace. His teammates carried him around the rink on their shoulders to a thunderous ovation.

Post-playing career
Mikhailov became a coach following his retirement from playing. In 1981–1984, 1992–1997, 2002–2005, and in March and November 2006, he was the head coach of SKA (St. Petersburg) (third medalist MHL 1994) and the head coach of CSKA from 1998–2001. From November 2007 to 2009, he was head coach of HC "Metallurg" Novokuznetsk.

Under his leadership (1992–1995, 2001–2002), the Russian national team won gold medals in the 1993 World Championships and finished second in 2002. He was head coach of the Russian team at the World Championships in 2005 and 2006 and at the Olympic Games in 2006.

Since 2011, together with Vladimir Petrov, Vladislav Tretiak, Georgy Poltavchenko, Sergei Egorov and Artur Chilingarov, he has been a member of the board of trustees of the International Tournament in Ice Hockey Arctic Cup.

Personal life
Boris graduated from the Moscow State Academy of Physical Culture in 1979. His son is Egor Mikhailov who is also a hockey player.

In the 2004 Disney biopic Miracle, he is portrayed by former NHL player Sasha Lakovic.

Mikhailov is a member of PutinTeam, Alexander Ovechkin's group that promotes President Putin and his policies.

Career statistics

Regular season

International

Awards and recognitions
 Soviet MVP: 1978, 1977
 Top Soviet goal scorer: 1975, 1976, 1978
 8-time Soviet All Star
 Best forward at the IIHF World Championships: 1973, 1979
 Top scorer at the IIHF World Championships: 1974
 Top goal scorer at the IIHF World Championships: 1977, 1978
 MVP at the 1979 Challenge Cup between the Soviet Union and the NHL All Stars
 Soviet Captain: 1972–1980
 Member of the IIHF Hall of Fame

Mikhailov was also one of the very few to receive the highest order of the Soviet Union, being awarded the Order of Lenin in 1978. He was also awarded the For Valor in Labor medal in 1969, the Badge of Honor in 1972, the Red Banner of Labor in 1975 and the Order For Services to the Fatherland (IV degree) in 2004.

References

External links

 Boris Mikhailov at Hockey CCCP International

1944 births
Communist Party of the Soviet Union members
HC CSKA Moscow players
Honoured Coaches of Russia
Honoured Masters of Sport of the USSR
Ice hockey players at the 1972 Winter Olympics
Ice hockey players at the 1976 Winter Olympics
Ice hockey players at the 1980 Winter Olympics
IIHF Hall of Fame inductees
Living people
Medalists at the 1972 Winter Olympics
Medalists at the 1976 Winter Olympics
Medalists at the 1980 Winter Olympics
Olympic gold medalists for the Soviet Union
Olympic ice hockey players of the Soviet Union
Olympic medalists in ice hockey
Olympic silver medalists for the Soviet Union
Recipients of the Order of Honour (Russia)
Recipients of the Order of Lenin
Russia men's national ice hockey team coaches
Russian ice hockey coaches
Soviet ice hockey right wingers
Russian ice hockey right wingers
Ice hockey people from Moscow